HIRA-interacting protein 3 is a protein that in humans is encoded by the HIRIP3 gene.

The HIRA protein shares sequence similarity with Hir1p and Hir2p, the two corepressors of histone gene transcription characterized in the yeast, Saccharomyces cerevisiae.  The structural features of the HIRA protein suggest that it may function as part of a protein complex.  Recently, several cDNAs encoding HIRA-interacting proteins, or HIRIPs, have been identified.  In vitro, the HIRIP3 gene product binds HIRA, as well as H2B and H3 core histones, indicating that a complex containing HIRA-HIRIP3 could function in some aspects of chromatin and histone metabolism.

References

Further reading